María del Rosario Gutiérrez Eskildsen (Villahermosa, Tabasco, April 16, 1899 – Mexico City May 12, 1979) was a Mexican lexicographer, linguist, educator, and poet who is remembered for her studies on the regional peculiarities of speech in her home state of Tabasco as well as for her pioneering work as a teacher and pedagogue in Tabasco and throughout Mexico. She has at times been described as Tabasco's first woman "professionist".

The community of María del Rosario Gutiérrez Eskildsen in Centla Municipality, Tabasco, is named in her honor.

Early life and education
She was born in Villahermosa (then known as San Juan Bautista) on what was then called Calle Grijalva, her parents were  Antonio Gutiérrez Carriles, a Spaniard, and Juana Eskildsen Cáceres de Gutiérrez, a native of Campeche of Danish descent.  She was orphaned at a young age when first her mother, and then her father, died; two of her five brothers would die young as well. In order to keep financially afloat, her sister María del Carmen gave piano lessons, while Rosario, along with her older brother Guillermo, sold copies of the local newspaper El correo de Tabasco on street corners, for which they earned about 10 centavos a day.

Gutiérrez Eskildsen was a dedicated student throughout her schooling, the first part of which she concluded at the Instituto Juárez of Villahermosa, an advanced preparatory school founded by politician and educator Manuel Sánchez Mármol. In 1918, at the age of 19, she moved to Mexico City in order to continue her studies, during the day working as a primary school teacher and during the evening attending classes at the Universidad Nacional Autónoma de México, from which she would obtain an M.A. in Spanish Literature and later a doctorate in Spanish linguistics. It was during this time that she succeeded in winning Barnard College's Lillian Emma Kimball Graduate Fellowship for Spanish studies at Columbia University (where her mentors would include professors Tomás Navarro Tomás and Federico de Onís).

Career
Gutiérrez Eskildsen would go on to write more than a dozen books and many more articles on topics pertaining to grammar and linguistics in general, and dialectology, language pedagogy, phonetics, and prosody, in particular; the studies Substrato y superestrato del español en Tabasco, Prosodia y fonética tabasqueña, Cómo hablamos en Tabasco y otros trabajos [How we talk in Tabasco] are considered, as in the case of the contributions of Marcos E. Becerra and Francisco J. Santamaría, to be pioneering works on the subject of Tabascan dialectology. She was also an avid epistler who corresponded assiduously with colleagues and former students alike.

Rosario María Gutiérrez Eskildsen never married, explaining, whenever asked, that her desire was to dedicate her life exclusively to her investigative and educational work. Nevertheless, she unexpectedly became the (adoptive) mother of a 17-year-old newly-orphaned teacher, Sergio Gómez Cabello, whose unhappy situation she learned about in 1953 while visiting the elementary school where he taught. She died in Mexico City in 1979 and was buried alongside her brother, Guillermo.

Selected works
Prosodia y fonética de Tabasco. 1934
El habla popular y campesina de Tabasco. 1941
Héroes civiles y mexicanos notables. 1950
Segundo curso de lengua y literatura españolas: (unidades de trabajo). 1962
Primer curso de español, unidades de trabajo. 1966
Cartilla para enseñar española. 1971
Introducción a la gramática estructural: para uso de los maestros de primeria y primer grado de enseñanza media. 1974
Información gramatical; sexto año primaria. 1974
Segundo curso de español; unidades de trabajo. 1974
Español, primer curso de enseñanza media, unidades por objetivos: conforme a los nuevos programas de la reforma educativa. 1976
Español, segundo curso de enseñanza media, unidades por objetivos: conforme a los nuevos programas de la reforma educativa.1976
Substrato y superestrato del español de Tabasco. 1978
Cómo hablamos en Tabasco y otros trabajos. 1981

See also
Diccionario de la lengua española de la Real Academia Española
Andrés Bello
Alfonso Caso
Miguel Antonio Caro
Rufino José Cuervo
Joaquín García Icazbalceta
Andrés Iduarte
María Moliner
Ramón Menéndez Pidal
Meshico

Bibliography
Leavitt, Sturgis E., "Theses Dealing with Hispano-American Language and Literature -- 1943", Hispania, Vol. 27, No. 2 (May, 1944), pp. 163–166.
Delaval, Alicia, Vida y obra de la doctora Rosario María Gutiérrez Eskildsen. Tabasco: Secur, 1986.
Chumacero, Rosalía, Perfil y pensamiento de la mujer mexicana. Mexico: Edición De La Aurora, 1961.
Ocampo de Gómez, Aurora Maura, Diccionario de escritores mexicanos, siglo XX : desde las generaciones del Ateneo y novelistas de la Revolución hasta nuestros días. 	Mexico: Universidad Nacional Autónoma de México, Instituto de Investigaciones Filológicas, Centro de Estudios Literarios, 1988

External links
Rosario María Gutiérrez Eskildsen 
En el olvido lexicógrafa Eskildsen 
Rosario María Gutiérrez Eskildsen 
Map of the community of María del Rosario Gutiérrez Eskildsen

1899 births
1979 deaths
Columbia University alumni
Mexican lexicographers
Mexican educators
Mexican people of Spanish descent
Mexican people of Danish descent
Linguists from Mexico
Mexican women poets
National Autonomous University of Mexico alumni
People from Villahermosa
Women lexicographers
20th-century Mexican poets
20th-century Mexican women writers
20th-century linguists
20th-century lexicographers